The 39th Curtis Cup Match was played from 10 to 12 June 2016 at Dun Laoghaire Golf Club near Enniskerry, Ireland. Great Britain and Ireland won 11 to 8. Bronte Law became the first golfer from Great Britain and Ireland to win 5 matches in a Curtis Cup match, a feat only previously achieved by Stacy Lewis in 2008.

Format
The contest was a three-day competition, with three foursomes and three fourball matches on each of the first two days, and eight singles matches on the final day, a total of 20 points.

Each of the 20 matches is worth one point in the larger team competition. If a match is all square after the 18th hole extra holes are not played. Rather, each side earns  a point toward their team total. The team that accumulates at least 10 points wins the competition. In the event of a tie, the current holder retains the Cup.

Teams
Eight players for the Great Britain & Ireland and USA participated in the event plus one non-playing captain for each team.

Six members of the Great Britain & Ireland team were selected automatically, the top four in the World Amateur Golf Ranking (WAGR) as of 27 April 2016 and the leading two players in the LGU’s Order of Merit not selected from the WAGR. The remaining two were picked by the LGU Selection Panel.

The American team was selected by the USGA’s International Team Selection Committee. American captain Robin Burke is the wife of Jack Burke Jr.

Friday's matches

Morning foursomes

Afternoon fourballs

Saturday's matches

Morning foursomes

Afternoon fourballs

Sunday's singles matches

References

External links
Official site
USGA site

Curtis Cup
Golf tournaments in the Republic of Ireland
Golf in Leinster
Sport in County Wicklow
International sports competitions hosted by Ireland
Curtis Cup
Curtis Cup
Curtis Cup